Sean Anthony Abbott (born 29 February 1992) is an Australian professional cricketer originally from Windsor in New South Wales who has represented his country internationally. After playing in junior cricket for Baulkham Hills Cricket Club, he progressed to play grade cricket for Parramatta District. Abbott completed his schooling at Gilroy College, Castle Hill. He is an all-rounder who bats right-handed.

Domestic and T20 franchise career

He made his List A debut for New South Wales against Western Australia at the Sydney Cricket Ground on 17 October 2010 in the 2010–11 Ryobi One-Day Cup, but neither bowled nor batted in the match.  He made his first-class cricket debut exactly one year later, against South Australia at the Adelaide Oval.

Abbott has played for Parramatta and Sydney University in the Sydney Grade Cricket competition and both of the Sydney teams in the Big Bash League, the Sydney Thunder in the 2011–12 and 2012–13 seasons and the Sydney Sixers in 2013–14.

During a Sheffield Shield match on 25 November 2014, Abbott bowled a bouncer that hit Phillip Hughes on the neck. Hughes died two days later at St Vincent's Hospital, Sydney, as a result of a vertebral artery dissection, leading to subarachnoid haemorrhage. Many of the condolence messages included support for Abbott. He returned to training the day before Hughes' funeral, and returned to play against Queensland in a Sheffield Shield match starting on 8 December 2014, returning a match-winning 6/14 in Queensland's second innings.

In January 2015, Abbott was named as Australia's young cricketer of the year. Abbott was bought by Royal Challengers Bangalore in the 2015 auctions for 10,000,000 rupees (approx 200,000 AUD).

Abbott was named the Sydney Sixers Player of the Tournament in BBL|06 after taking 20 wickets over 10 games. He shared the award with Sixers batsmen Daniel Hughes.

On 28 August 2017 the Sixers announced that Abbott had re-signed with the club for three more editions of the Big Bash League. He played for New South Wales in the 2017–18 JLT One-Day Cup and took 12 wickets, the most of any player in the team.

Ahead of the 2019–20 Marsh One-Day Cup, Abbott was named as one of the six cricketers to watch during the tournament. In November 2020, in round four of the 2020–21 Sheffield Shield season, Abbott scored his maiden century in first-class cricket.

In April 2021 English county Surrey announced the signing of Abbott as their second overseas player for the season, specifically for the T20 Vitality Blast competition and also three County Championship matches. He made his first class Surrey debut on 27 May 2021 at The Oval against Gloucestershire.

In February 2022, he was bought by the Sunrisers Hyderabad in the auction for the 2022 Indian Premier League tournament. In April 2022, he was bought by the Manchester Originals for the 2022 season of The Hundred.

International career
He made his Twenty20 International debut for Australia against Pakistan in the United Arab Emirates on 5 October 2014. Two days later, he made his One Day International debut, also against Pakistan in the UAE.  He then played in two more Twenty20 matches for Australia against South Africa in early November 2014.

He was awarded the Bradman Young Cricketer of the Year at the Allan Border Medal ceremony by the CA in 2015.

In 2019, Abbott made his return to Australia's international side after a five-year hiatus, taking 2/14 off his four overs against Pakistan at Optus Stadium. On 16 July 2020, Abbott was named in a 26-man preliminary squad of players to begin training ahead of a possible tour to England following the COVID-19 pandemic. On 14 August 2020, Cricket Australia confirmed that the fixtures would be taking place, with Abbott included in the touring party.

In November 2020, Abbott was named in Australia's Test squad for their series against India.

References

External links

 Sean Abbott IPL Profile  from RoyalChallengers

1992 births
Living people
Australian cricketers
Australia One Day International cricketers
Australia Twenty20 International cricketers
Cricketers from Sydney
New South Wales cricketers
Sydney Thunder cricketers
Sydney Sixers cricketers
Royal Challengers Bangalore cricketers
Sunrisers Hyderabad cricketers
Manchester Originals cricketers
Australian expatriate sportspeople in England
Australian expatriate sportspeople in India